Whitefriars is an area in the Ward of Farringdon Without in the City of London.
Until 1540, it was the site of a Carmelite monastery, from which it gets its name.

History

The area takes its name from the medieval Carmelite religious house, known as the White Friars, that lay here between about 1247 and 1538.  Only a crypt remains today of what was once a late 14th century priory belonging to a Carmelite order popularly known as the White Friars because of the white mantles they wore on formal occasions. During its heyday, the priory sprawled the area from Fleet Street to the Thames. At its western end was the Temple and to its east was Water Lane (now called Whitefriars Street). A church, cloisters, garden and cemetery were housed in the ground.

The roots of the Carmelite order go back to its founding on Mount Carmel, which was situated in what is today Israel, in 1150. The order had to flee Mount Carmel to escape the wrath of the Saracens in 1238. Some members of the order found a sympathizer in Richard, Earl of Cornwall, and brother of King Henry III, who helped them travel to England, where they built a church on Fleet Street in 1253. A larger church supplanted this one a hundred years later.

The Whitefriars crypt 
A vaulted cellar of the medieval friary survives under the modern 65 Fleet Street building. The 14th-century cellar was probably part of the White Friars prior's mansion. The medieval remains were lifted up on a crane during the construction of the modern building in 1991 and then replaced (in a slightly altered location); the cellar or 'crypt' can be viewed from Magpie Alley to the south of Fleet Street.

Burials
John de Mowbray, 1st Earl of Nottingham
Robert Knolles
Robert Mascall
Richard Empson
Henry Bromflete, Lord Vescy
sir Matthew Gough

Dark side
Whitefriars was known as a red-light district in early modern England; and (under the name of  Alsatia) as a haunt of criminals, being a place of sanctuary until 1697.

Alsatia

Alsatia was the name given to an area within Whitefriars that was once privileged as a  sanctuary. It spanned from the Whitefriars monastery to the south of the west end of Fleet Street and adjacent to the Temple.  Between the fifteenth and seventeenth centuries it was proofed against all but a writ of the Lord Chief Justice or of the Lords of the Privy Council, becoming a refuge for perpetrators of every grade of crime.

It was named after the ancient name for Alsace, a region outside legislative and juridical lines, and first appeared in print in a 1688 play by Thomas Shadwell, The Squire of Alsatia.  To this day it remains used as a term depicting an area beyond the law.

The execution of a warrant in Alsatia, if at any time practicable, was attended with great danger, as all united in a maintenance in common of the immunity of the place. It was one of the last places of sanctuary used in England, abolished by Act of Parliament named The Escape from Prison Act in 1697 and a further Act in 1723. Eleven other places in London were named in the Acts (The Minories, The Mint, Salisbury Court, Whitefriars, Fulwoods Rents, Mitre Court, Baldwins Gardens, The Savoy, The Clink, Deadmans Place, Montague Close, and Stepney).

References

Geography of the City of London